Handsome Poets is a Dutch indie pop band consisting of five members: Tim van Esch (lead singer), Daniel Smit (drummer), Nils Davidse (keyboard), Erik Bruil (guitar), and Ricardo Szabó (bass guitar). This group was founded in 2009 in Gouda.

Discography

Albums 
 Handsome Poets (2011) (highest rank 13 on the Mega Top 50)
 Sky On Fire (2012)
 2015 (2015)

Singles 
 Blinded (2010)
 Dance (The war is over) (2010)
 (We can't be) Saints	(2011)
 Sky on fire (2012)
 New Life (2012)
 Alright (2013)

References

External links 
 Handsome Poets' official web site

Dutch indie rock groups
English-language singers from the Netherlands